Argulus is a genus of fish lice in the family Argulidae. There are about 140 accepted species in the genus Argulus. They occur in marine, brackish, and freshwater environments. As juveniles, these species feed on mucous and skin cells of their host. With age they become blood feeders because the parasite moves from feeding on the fins to feeding on the body of the fish, causing the feeding change.

Taxonomy

As of December 2022, 138 species are accepted:

References

Further reading

External links

 

Crustacean genera
Taxa named by Otto Friedrich Müller
Articles created by Qbugbot